Andrej Kerić (born 11 February 1986) is a retired Croatian professional footballer who played as a striker.

Club career 
Kerić started his football career in the town of Vinkovci by the local side Cibalia. In the 2003–04 season Kerić first appeared in the first squad of Cibalia. In four seasons at Cibalia, Kerić scored 9 goals in 64 matches.

In February 2008 he signed a three and a half-year  contract with Czech club Slovan Liberec. Kerić soon became one of the most valuable players at Liberec. He scored six goals and helped the team to sixth place in the final league standings. Kerić scored 15 goals in the 2008–09 season and became the top scorer of the league.

On 29 January 2011, he signed for Sparta Prague.

In 2014, Kerić joined F91 Dudelange of Luxemburg.

References

External links 
 
 fotbal.idnes.cz Profile 
 Player profile 

1986 births
Living people
Sportspeople from Vinkovci
Association football forwards
Croatian footballers
Croatia under-21 international footballers
HNK Cibalia players
FC Slovan Liberec players
AC Sparta Prague players
FK Teplice players
F91 Dudelange players
MFK Zemplín Michalovce players
United Victory players
Maziya S&RC players
NK Istra 1961 players
Czech First League players
Luxembourg National Division players
Slovak Super Liga players
Dhivehi Premier League players
Croatian Football League players
First Football League (Croatia) players
Croatian expatriate footballers
Expatriate footballers in the Czech Republic
Expatriate footballers in Luxembourg
Expatriate footballers in Slovakia
Expatriate footballers in the Maldives
Croatian expatriate sportspeople in the Czech Republic
Croatian expatriate sportspeople in Slovakia
Croatian expatriate sportspeople in Luxembourg
Croatian expatriate sportspeople in the Maldives